Ahmad Zulkifli Lubis (23 February 1971 – 17 February 2022) was an Indonesian actor, voice actor, comedian, and occupation who used to work at PT. Indosiar Visual Mandiri. He dubbed anime and other foreign content into the Indonesian language. He could perform voices for young boys, teenage boys and adult men. He was also known by the names Ahmad Zulkifli for short, or Iphie Lubis as his nickname.

Biography
Born on 23 February 1971, Ahmad Zulkifli Lubis first worked as a dubber for Arvisco, dubbing telenovelas and Indian films, in 1992. Lubis then joined Indonesian TV network Indosiar and dubbed various shows, including Case Closed (Detektif Conan in Indonesia) where he voiced Shinichi Kudo/Conan Edogawa.

Lubis died on 17 February 2022, at the age of 50, two days after being admitted to the hospital.

Voice roles

Dubbing

Anime television
Crush Gear Turbo - Kouya Marino
Detective Conan - Shinichi Kudo/Conan Edogawa
Digimon Adventure - Jo Kido (first voice)
Dragon Ball Z Kai - Krillin, Yamcha
Dr. Slump - Opening dub vocal, Obotchama, Son Goku
Fairy Tail - Natsu Dragneel
Isami's Incredible Shinsen Squad - Kikumaru, Hiroshi
Gintama (first season) - Shinpachi Shimura (second voice)
Gundam Wing - Duo Maxwell
Keroro Gunso (first season) - Keroro
Pokémon - Ash Ketchum (Satoshi), Meowth (additional voice) (2001-current)
Sailor Moon - Shingo Tsukino, Gurio Umino
Scan2Go - Kaz
Tantei Gakuen Q - Kyū Renjō
Doraemon - Suneo Honekawa (1994-2006, 2008–2009, formerly 2009)

Anime films
Detective Conan: The Time-Bombed Skyscraper - Shinichi Kudo/Conan Edogawa
Detective Conan: The Fourteenth Target - Shinichi Kudo/Conan Edogawa
Detective Conan: The Last Wizard of the Century - Shinichi Kudo/Conan Edogawa
Detective Conan: Captured In Her Eyes - Shinichi Kudo/Conan Edogawa
Detective Conan: Countdown to Heaven - Shinichi Kudo/Conan Edogawa
Detective Conan: The Phantom of Baker Street - Shinichi Kudo/Conan Edogawa
Detective Conan: Crossroad in the Ancient Capital - Shinichi Kudo/Conan Edogawa
Detective Conan: Magician of the Silver Sky - Shinichi Kudo/Conan Edogawa
Detective Conan: Strategy Above the Depths - Shinichi Kudo/Conan Edogawa
Detective Conan: The Private Eye's Requiem - Shinichi Kudo/Conan Edogawa
Detective Conan: Jolly Roger in the Deep Azure - Shinichi Kudo/Conan Edogawa
Detective Conan: Full Score of Fear - Shinichi Kudo/Conan Edogawa
Detective Conan: The Raven Chaser - Shinichi Kudo/Conan Edogawa
Detective Conan: The Lost Ship in the Sky - Shinichi Kudo/Conan Edogawa
Pokémon: Lucario and the Mystery of Mew - Ash Ketchum (Satoshi)
Pokémon Ranger and the Temple of the Sea - Ash Ketchum (Satoshi)
Pokémon: The Rise of Darkrai - Ash Ketchum (Satoshi)
Pokémon: Giratina and the Sky Warrior - Ash Ketchum (Satoshi)
Pokémon: Arceus and the Jewel of Life - Ash Ketchum (Satoshi)
Pokémon: Zoroark: Master of Illusions - Ash Ketchum (Satoshi)

Western animation
Ben 10 (first season) - Ben Tennyson
The Adventures of Jimmy Neutron: Boy Genius (first season) - Carl Wheezer
The Garfield Show - Nermal
Transformers: Prime - Jack Darby
The Amazing World Of Gumball - Gumball Watterson
SpongeBob SquarePants (season 9–12) - SpongeBob SquarePants
 Ben 10: Omniverse (Ben Tennyson)
 Ben 10 Reboot (Ben Tennyson)

Animated films

Monster House - DJ Walters

Live action films
Harry Potter and the Deathly Hallows – Part 1 - Harry Potter (Daniel Radcliffe) (Aired on HBO dubbed) 
Harry Potter and the Deathly Hallows – Part 2 - Harry Potter (Daniel Radcliffe) (Aired on HBO dubbed)

References

1971 births
2022 deaths
Indonesian male actors
Indonesian male comedians
Indonesian comedians
Indonesian male voice actors